The Jefferson Avenue–Huron River and Harbin Drive–Silver Creek Canal Bridges are two separate bridges, sharing a continuous railing, that were jointly listed on the National Register of Historic Places on February 10, 2000.

The Jefferson Avenue Bridge carries West Jefferson Avenue (known south of the river as the U.S. Turnpike) across the Huron River, which connects Brownstown Charter Township in Wayne County to Berlin Charter Township in Monroe County.  Along with the Clinton–Kalamazoo Canal and Main Street Historic District, it is one of three properties listed on the National Register in Michigan to span two counties.  The Harbin Drive Bridge is located entirely within Wayne County.  Both bridges are located about one mile (0.6 km) inland from Lake Erie on a historically important route between Detroit and Toledo.  The Jefferson Avenue Bridge is also designated as a Michigan Historic Site.

Jefferson Avenue Bridge

The larger of the two bridges is the three-span Jefferson Avenue Bridge. It carries a two-lane road, known as West Jefferson Avenue north of the river and as the U.S. Turnpike south of the river. It was built in 1930 by the Michigan Department of Transportation and replaced an earlier hand drawn swing bridge. The new beam bridge was built high enough to ensure it could remain stationary and still allow small vessels to pass beneath it. Due to its age, the bridge's structure has deteriorated in recent years, but the driving road surface was repaired as recently as 2016.

Harbin Drive Bridge

It carries the sparsely traveled Harbin Drive over the Silver Creek Canal, which drains into the Huron River. It is located just north of the Jefferson Avenue Bridge, and the two are connected by a continuous railing. The Harbin Drive Bridge was actually constructed a few years earlier than the Jefferson Avenue Bridge, although this exact construction date is unknown. Harbin Drive is a gravel road that connects a few residential dwellings on a narrow island in the river.

See also

References
Notes

Sources

Bridges in Wayne County, Michigan
Buildings and structures in Monroe County, Michigan
Road bridges on the National Register of Historic Places in Michigan
Michigan State Historic Sites
Bridges completed in 1930
Transportation in Monroe County, Michigan
National Register of Historic Places in Wayne County, Michigan
National Register of Historic Places in Monroe County, Michigan
Concrete bridges in the United States
Huron River (Michigan)